The Rewrite anime television series is based on the visual novel of the same name by the Japanese visual novel brand Key. The episodes are produced by the animation studio Eight Bit and are directed by Tensho. The screenplay is written by Takashi Aoshima and Tatsuya Takahashi with Romeo Tanaka and Kai credited with collaborating on the composition and scripts. The series features character design by Masayuki Nonaka who based the designs on Itaru Hinoue's original concepts. The story follows the life of Kotarou Tennouji, a high school student with superhuman abilities who investigates supernatural mysteries with five girls from his school in the fictional city of Kazamatsuri. This ultimately leads him into the middle of a conflict between familiar summoners and superhumans with the fate of the world at stake.

The first 13 episodes of the 24-episode series aired between July 2 and September 24, 2016 on the BS-11, Gunma TV, Tochigi TV and Tokyo MX television networks in Japan. It aired at later dates on MBS and AT-X. The latter 11 episodes aired from January 14 to March 25, 2017, which adapts the Moon and Terra routes from the visual novel. The series was also streamed by Crunchyroll with English subtitles. The series was released on 13 DVD and Blu-ray compilation volumes between September 28, 2016 and September 27, 2017 by Aniplex.

The anime series makes use of seven main pieces of theme music: four opening themes and three ending themes. Both songs are remixes of theme songs featured in the original Rewrite visual novel and its fan disc Rewrite Harvest festa!. The second opening theme is "End of the World" by Anri Kumaki and the second ending theme is "Word of Dawn" by Aoi Tada. The fourth opening theme is "Last Desire" sung by Maon Kurosaki and the third ending theme is "Instincts" by Mizutani.

Eight additional ending themes include  by Nagi Yanagi used in episode four,  by Ayaka Kitazawa used in episode five,  by Yanagi used in episode 10,  by Mizutani used in episode 13, "Daisy Memory" composed by Maiko Iuchi used in episode 14, "A Seed Leaf" composed by Iuchi used in episode 15,  sung by Tada used in episode 16, and "Canoe" sung by Tada used in episode 24. Three songs are also used as insert songs: "Innocence Eye" sung by Mizutani in episode 15, "Rewrite" by Psychic Lover in episode 16, and "Philosophyz" sung by Mizutani in episode 24. The rest of the soundtrack for the anime series is sampled from the Rewrite Original Soundtrack and Feast.


Episode list

References

External links
Rewrite anime official website 

Key (company)
Lists of anime episodes